The Minard Editor Award is given annually as part of the Gerald Loeb Awards to recognize business editors "whose work does not receive a byline or whose face does not appear on the air for the work covered." The award is named in honor of Lawrence Minard, the former editor of Forbes Global, who died in 2001. The first award was given posthumously to Minard in 2002.

Minard Editor Award winners
 2002: Lawrence Minard, editor of Forbes Global
 2003: Glenn Kramon, business editor of The New York Times
 2004: Michael Siconolfi, financial investigative projects senior editor at The Wall Street Journal
 2005: Timothy K. Smith, assistant managing editor at Fortune
 2006: Ronald Henkoff, executive editor at Bloomberg News and editor at Bloomberg Markets
 2007: Dan Kelly, news editor, page one, at The Wall Street Journal
 2008: Frank Comes, assistant managing editor at BusinessWeek
 2009: Lawrence Ingrassia, business and financial editor at The New York Times
 2010: Alix Freedman, deputy managing editor at The Wall Street Journal
 2011: Hank Gilman, deputy managing editor at Fortune
 2012: Winnie O'Kelley, deputy business editor at The New York Times
 2013: Michael Williams, global enterprise editor of Reuters
 2014: John Brecher, executive editor for enterprise at Bloomberg News
 2015: Rebecca Blumenstein, deputy editor in chief of The Wall Street Journal
 2016: Amy Stevens, executive editor of professional news at Reuters
 2017: Nicholas Varchaver, assistant managing editor at Fortune
 2018: John Hillkirk, senior enterprise projects editor at Kaiser Health News
 2019: Michael Miller, senior editor of features and WSJ weekend at The Wall Street Journal
 2020: Alessandra Galloni, Global Managing Editor at Reuters
 2021: Garry D. Howard, director of corporate initiatives for American City Business Journals

References

External links
 Gerald Loeb Lifetime Achievement Award and Lawrence Minard Editor Award historical winners lists

American journalism awards
Gerald Loeb Award winners